The CMLL Torneo Nacional de Parejas Increíbles 2015 or "National Incredible Pairs Tournament 2015" was a Lucha Libre or professional wrestling, tournaments for Tag Teams held by the Mexican wrestling promotion Consejo Mundial de Lucha Libre (CMLL). The tournament was based on the Lucha Libre Parejas Increíbles match concept where two wrestlers of opposite allegiance, portraying either villains, referred to as "Rudos" in Lucha Libre wrestling terminology or fan favorites, or "tecnicos". At times some of the team members were part of a pre-existing scripted feuds or storylines with each other. The tournament was won by rivals Máximo and El Terrible, who at the time of the tournament had already signed a contract to face off in a Luchas de Apuestas at the upcoming 2015 Homenaje a Dos Leyendas. The 2015 version of the tournament was the sixth overall time CMLL has held such a tournament, starting in 2010 and always held early in the year.

Tournament
Consejo Mundial de Lucha Libre (CMLL) started their sixth annual Torneo Nacional De Parejas Increíbles tournament on February 20 and it will continue on the two subsequent shows of CMLL's Friday night CMLL Super Viernes shows. Being a professional wrestling tournament, it is not won legitimately to combat; it is instead won via a scripted ending to wrestling matches, often incorporating storylines between two or more of the competitors.

Místico was originally announced as part of the tournament, teaming with Ripper in the first block, but on the night of the tournament he was replaced by Guerrero Maya Jr. with no official explanation. Most of the teams in the tournament were actively engaged in storyline feuds at the time the tournament was announced. The team of Dragon Lee and Kamaitachi had already signed a contract for a Luchas de Apuestas, mask vs. mask match at the upcoming 2015 Homenaje a Dos Leyendas show; while Block A winners Volador Jr. and Rey Bucanero are slated to be on opposite sides of the tag team main event match of Dos Leyendas. The tournament is supposed to mark the return of Rush who suffered a broken leg in 2014. He was originally announced as making his return for the tournament on February 20, but when the card was announced Rush was not included in Group A of the tournament but later booked in Bock B instead. The finals of the tournament will be Volador Jr. and Rey Bucanero facing off against the team of Máximo and El Terrible pitting the four men in the main event of the 2015 Homenaje a Dos Leyendas show. In the end the team of Máximo and El Terrible defeated Volador Jr. and Rey Bucanero to win the entire tournament.

Tournament Participants
Key

Block A

Delta  and Misterioso Jr. 
Dragon Lee  and Kamaitachi 
La Máscara  and Mephisto 
Guerrero Maya Jr.  and Ripper 
Titán  and Bárbaro Cavernario 
Valiente  and Euforia 
Volador Jr.  and Rey Bucanero 
La Sombra  and Negro Casas 

Block B

Ángel de Oro  and Hechicero 
Atlantis  and Último Guerrero 
Blue Panther  and El Felino 
Marco Corleone  and Thunder 
Dragón Rojo Jr.  and Niebla Roja 
Máximo  and El Terrible 
Rush  and Shocker 
Stuka Jr.  and Gran Guerrero

Tournament results

References

2015 in professional wrestling
CMLL Torneo Nacional de Parejas Increibles